Torre Realia BCN (also Torres de Toyo Ito with Hotel Porta Fira) is a skyscraper on the Plaça d'Europa in the district of Granvia l'Hospitalet in L'Hospitalet de Llobregat, a city of Barcelonès, Catalonia, Spain. Completed in 2009, it has 24 floors and rises 112 meters.

See also 

 List of tallest buildings in Barcelona

References 

Skyscraper office buildings in Barcelona
Office buildings completed in 2009
Toyo Ito buildings
2009 establishments in Catalonia